Brant James Pitre (born 1975 in New Orleans, Louisiana) is a New Testament scholar and Distinguished Research Professor of Scripture at the Augustine Institute. He has written extensively on the historical Jesus, the Virgin Mary, Paul the Apostle, the origin of the Eucharist, and the canonical Gospels.

After receiving his B.A. in Philosophy and English Literature from Louisiana State University in 1997, Pitre engaged in biblical studies: he received a G.C. in biblical archaeology in 1998 from Tel Aviv University, a M.T.S. from Vanderbilt University Divinity School in 1999 and, eventually, his Ph.D. from the University of Notre Dame. While at Vanderbilt, Pitre studied under Professor Amy-Jill Levine, while at Notre Dame he met and studied under Father John P. Meier.

He was Assistant Professor of Theology at Loyola University New Orleans from 2003 to 2005, while from 2005 to 2009 he was Adjunct Professor of Scripture at Notre Dame Seminary, Visiting Professor of Theology at the University of Notre Dame and Donum Dei Professor of Word and Sacrament and Assistant Professor of Theology at Our Lady of Holy Cross College. From 2009 to 2018 he served as Professor of Sacred Scripture at Notre Dame Seminary, before moving to his current position at the Augustine Institute. He is a member of the Society of Biblical Literature, the Catholic Biblical Association, and a Senior Fellow at St. Paul Center for Biblical Theology.

In his works, Pitre has consistently defended the Catholic dogma of transubstantiation, the perpetual virginity of Mary, the divinity of Jesus, and traditional authorship of the Gospels. His books have been praised by Bishop Robert Barron and several Roman Catholic leaders. He was also a contributor to the Dictionary of Jesus And the Gospels, where he wrote articles about Jewish eschatology in regard to Jesus.

Pitre is a Roman Catholic and currently lives in Louisiana with his wife Elizabeth and their five children.

Bibliography 

 Jesus, the Tribulation, and the End of the Exile, Mohr Siebeck, 2005.
 Jesus and the Jewish Roots of the Eucharist: Unlocking the Secrets of the Last Supper, Doubleday, 2011, with forward by Dr. Scott Hahn.
 Jesus the Bridegroom: The Greatest Love Story Ever Told, Crown Publishing, 2014.
 Jesus and the Last Supper, Eerdmans, 2015.
 The Case for Jesus: The Biblical and Historical Evidence for Christ, Crown Publishing, 2016.
 A Catholic Introduction to the Bible: The Old Testament, Ignatius Press, 2018.
 Jesus and the Jewish Roots of Mary: Unveiling the Mother of the Messiah, Crown Publishing, 2018.
 Paul, a New Covenant Jew: Rethinking Pauline Theology, co-authored with Michael P. Barber and John A. Kincaid, Eerdmans, 2019.
 Introduction to the Spiritual Life: Walking the Path of Prayer with Jesus, Crown Publishing, 2021.

References 

1975 births

Living people
New Testament scholars
American biblical scholars
20th-century American Roman Catholic theologians
21st-century American Roman Catholic theologians